South Chicago Heights is a village and a south suburb in Cook County, Illinois, United States. The population was 4,026 at the 2020 census.

Geography
South Chicago Heights is located at  (41.483375, −87.637461).

Demographics
As of the 2020 census there were 4,026 people, 1,560 households, and 1,056 families residing in the village. The racial makeup of the village was 39.15% White, 17.44% African American, 1.19% Native American, 1.71% Asian, 0.07% Pacific Islander, 23.80% from other races, and 16.64% from two or more races. Hispanic or Latino of any race were 47.19% of the population.

There were 1,560 households, out of which 84.81% had children under the age of 18 living with them, 33.08% were married couples living together, 26.03% had a female householder with no husband present, and 32.31% were non-families. 32.31% of all households were made up of individuals, and 9.68% had someone living alone who was 65 years of age or older. The average household size was 3.16 and the average family size was 2.52.

The village's age distribution consisted of 33.7% under the age of 18, 6.8% from 18 to 24, 15.9% from 25 to 44, 28.5% from 45 to 64, and 15.1% who were 65 years of age or older. The median age was 34.8 years. For every 100 females, there were 71.5 males. For every 100 females age 18 and over, there were 76.5 males.

The median income for a household in the village was $45,321, and the median income for a family was $46,799. Males had a median income of $39,797 versus $30,529 for females. The per capita income for the village was $19,323. About 18.1% of families and 18.7% of the population were below the poverty line, including 22.7% of those under age 18 and 14.9% of those age 65 or over.

Note: the US Census treats Hispanic/Latino as an ethnic category. This table excludes Latinos from the racial categories and assigns them to a separate category. Hispanics/Latinos can be of any race.

Government
South Chicago Heights is in Illinois's 2nd congressional district.

References

External links
Village of South Chicago Heights official website

Villages in Illinois
Villages in Cook County, Illinois
Chicago metropolitan area
Majority-minority cities and towns in Cook County, Illinois